Koraon is a constituency of the Uttar Pradesh Legislative Assembly covering the city of Koraon in the Allahabad district of Uttar Pradesh, India.

Koraon is one of five assembly constituencies in the Allahabad Lok Sabha constituency. Since 2008, this assembly constituency is numbered 265 amongst 403 constituencies.

Election results

2022

2017
Bharatiya Janta Party candidate Rajmani won in 2017 Uttar Pradesh Legislative Elections defeating Indian National Congress candidate Ram Kripal by a margin of 53,696 votes.

References

External links
 

Assembly constituencies of Uttar Pradesh
Politics of Allahabad district